Tube and clamp scaffold (commonly called tube and coupler scaffold) is a versatile type of scaffold consisting of steel or aluminium tubes and clamps.  Vertical tubes are connected to horizontal tubes via right angle clamps.  Diagonal tubes are periodically connected to the scaffold via swivel clamps in order to stabilize the scaffold.

This type of scaffold is generally used where unlimited versatility is required. In many countries, it is common in construction. Horizontal tubes (and thus walking-decks) can be placed at any height along the vertical tube (as permitted by engineering constraints), and vertical tubes, or legs, can be spaced at any distance apart, up to the maximum distance allowed by engineering constraints.

Tube and Clamp equipment can be dismantled, stored and transported easier than other types scaffolding. It has the highest ratio of volume built to space required for storage.

References

UK Health & Safety Executive Scaffold Checklist

External links
 OSHA: A Guide to Scaffold Use in the Construction Industry

 Crawley Scaffolding Company

Scaffolding